Scott Galloway (born November 3, 1964) is a professor of marketing at the New York University Stern School of Business, and a public speaker, author, podcast host, and entrepreneur.

Career 
He grew up in Los Angeles, California. His father was a Scottish immigrant to the United States who worked as a sales executive. His mother, an immigrant too, worked as a secretary.

Galloway attended the University of California, Los Angeles, where he earned a Bachelor of Arts degree in Economics in 1987, and the UC Berkeley Haas School of Business, graduating with an MBA in 1992.

In 1992, he founded Prophet, a brand and marketing consultancy firm; in 1997, Galloway founded Red Envelope, one of the earliest e-commerce sites. In 2005 Galloway founded the digital intelligence firm L2 Inc, which was acquired in March 2017 by Gartner for $155 million, and the now defunct Firebrand Partners (founded in 2005), an activist hedge fund that invested over $1 billion in U.S. consumer and media companies. In 2019, Galloway founded the online education startup Section4. He raised $30 million in the Series A round in 2021 for a total funding of $37 million.

He was elected to the World Economic Forum's "Global Leaders of Tomorrow," which recognizes 100 individuals under the age of 40 whose accomplishments have had impact on a global level.

He has served on the board of directors of Eddie Bauer, The New York Times Company, Gateway Computer, Urban Outfitters, and Berkeley's Haas School of Business. Galloway is also known for his public presentations and TED-style talks, called Winners & Losers, in which he presented L2's Digital IQ Index results, ranking over 2,500 global brands across numerous dimensions including e-commerce, social media, and digital marketing.

Galloway teaches brand management and digital marketing to second-year MBA students. Much of his research focuses on "The Four," or "the Four Horsemen." His first book, The Four: The Hidden DNA of Amazon, Apple, Facebook, and Google, was published in 2017. It analyzes the four companies' peculiar strengths and strategies, their novel economic models, their inherent rapacity, their ambition, and the drastic consequences of their rise that people face in both social and individual terms. In May 2017, Galloway anticipated Amazon's acquisition of Whole Foods Market, a transaction that became reality the following month. He denied any insider knowledge and said he was "just lucky" on that call.

On Friday, September 28, 2018, Recode and the Vox Media Podcast Network launched Pivot, a weekly news commentary podcast co-hosted by Kara Swisher and Galloway. In February 2020, Galloway launched The Prof G Show, a weekly podcast answering listener questions on business, money, and tech.

On September 28, 2021, CNN announced that Galloway would be a host on its CNN+ streaming platform, though the platform went off the air shortly after launching.

Positions 

Since 2017, Galloway repeatedly called for U.S. government antitrust intervention against the four consumer technology companies Apple, Meta Platforms, Amazon and Alphabet, ultimately breaking them up. He advocated against Facebook's Libra cryptocurrency plans in July 2019 due to the company's "gross negligence of user privacy." In 2019, he endorsed Michael Bloomberg's presidential 2020 candidacy as he "fulfills the Democrats' need for a strong centrist candidate." In December 2019, he called for the removal of Twitter CEO Jack Dorsey while declaring to own more than 330,000 shares of Twitter stock. Relating to the 2015–16 Apple-FBI dispute, he sided with the U.S. government and said that "security agencies should have access to [personal] data wherever it is if a judge deems that data is key to people's safety or national security." 

Galloway has called for taxing endowments of universities whose enrollment growth is not commensurate with population growth, suggesting exclusivity makes such universities a "luxury brand" as opposed to a public service. He has written about growing up an unremarkable child of immigrant parents and has said the goal of universities should be to educate not just exceptional students, but also the unremarkable. Galloway is a Clinical Professor of Marketing at NYU Stern School of Business where he teaches Brand Strategy and Digital Marketing to second-year MBA students. Galloway donates 100% of his NYU salary back to the university. He donated $4.4 million to Berkeley for immigrant student fellowships as well as smaller sums to UCLA and NYU.

Galloway self-describes as an atheist. He advises his students not to follow their passion, but to follow their talent.

When Galloway's mother passed, he was devastated, but it gave him a lot of perspective on life, and he realized the value of forgiveness, as everything always comes to pass, and being aware of ones reactions to situations is where growth happens.

In popular culture
Galloway is played by Kelly AuCoin in the 2022 series WeCrashed.

Books

References

External links

 
 
 "Why Amazon, Apple, Facebook, and Google Need to Be Disrupted", Esquire, March 2018
 The Four Horsemen – An Interview with Scott Galloway", The Marketing Journal, October 2017

1964 births
Advertising theorists
American atheists
American marketing people
Branding consultants
Business educators
Living people
Marketing people
Marketing theorists
New York University faculty
University of California, Los Angeles alumni
American people of Scottish descent